Levi9 Ukraine is a Ukrainian division of Levi9 Global Sourcing located in Kyiv, Ukraine. The company is a nearshore provider of custom software development, application maintenance and QA services with primary focus on enterprise application development, document management systems, business automation and mobile solutions.

The company was formed as a result of merger between parent company Levi9 Global Sourcing and a Ukrainian-based Mirasoft Group. The origin company was founded in 1989 by the group of scientists from Kyiv-based Gloshkov Institute of Cybernetics and regarded as first professional IT service provider in Soviet Union. The first company's headquarters was in the Institute of Cybernetics as well.

Technology focus
The company is a Microsoft Gold Certified partner and member of Sun Advantage Program with .NET and Java R&D centers.

Levi9 Ukraine is a listed Microsoft solution finder partner with the following products:

 Mirapolys Rapid Application Development (RAD) Platform for rapid creation and modification of business applications.
SharePoint Business Portal - Microsoft registered Internet, e-commerce portal based on MS SharePoint technology.

Business focus
Since the establishment in 1989 the company positioned itself as a developer of complex object-oriented systems (ERP, CRM and XRM) and Rapid Application Development(RAD) platforms for business application development.

First software product was built in 1991 when the company developed Mirapolys - Rapid Application Development (RAD) platform for Swiss software company Miracle AG. Afterwards applications that were built on Mirapolys RAD platform obtained wide spreading across various industries and Miracle was named one of TOP100 Manufacturing Software Firms.,

Afterwards, Levi9 Ukraine has participated in the development of various ERP and CRM platforms, including such heavyweights as Epicor iScala ERP platform and Evidence XP CRM Platform.

The company developed its own product line, which subsequently has been transferred to partners including Virtuoso ERP system, corporate web-portal Corvet and Mirapolys RAD-platform. Corporate solution CORVET has been registered and approved by special Microsoft Office Partnerships program.

References

External links
 

Software companies of Ukraine
Outsourcing companies